Rushlights is a 2013 American independent neo-noir thriller film written and directed by Antoni Stutz and starring Beau Bridges, Haley Webb, Josh Henderson and Aidan Quinn. Rushlights was included in the official selections of the Montreal World Film Festival, the Shanghai International Film Festival, the Dallas International Film Festival as well as the Newport Beach Film Festival. An extended directors cut was released in 2016.

Plot 
A dark and gritty mystery thriller, Rushlights centers on two delinquent young lovers from the suburbs of Los Angeles traveling to a small Texas town to falsely claim the inheritance of a dead friend. The teens, haunted by their dubious pasts, wind up in a nightmare of greed and betrayal as they encounter the twisted underworld of Tremo, Texas – population 2870.

Cast
 Beau Bridges as Sheriff Brogden
 Haley Webb as Sarah
 Josh Henderson as Billy
 Aidan Quinn as Cameron Brogden
 Jordan Bridges as Earl
 Lorna Raver as Belle Brogden
 Joel McKinnon Miller as Sal Marinaro
 Crispian Belfrage as Eddie Romero
 Philip Lenkowsky as Sly Wheaton
 Eileen Grubba as Alice
 Terence Bernie Hines as Joe
 Nestor Absera as Jamie Albright

Reception
Brandon Harris of Filmmaker magazine wrote: “An array of impressive performances… the film is reminiscent of John Dahl’s early 90s thrillers Red Rock West and The Last Seduction.”

Patrick Washington of The Dallas Weekly on Rushlights: “One of the best thrillers I’ve seen.” Mike Smith of Mediamikes gave the thriller 4/5stars writing: “Packed with genuine surprises and emotion… Stutz’s direction is clear and sharp.”

Neil Genzlinger of The New York Times wrote: “When it comes to film plotting, too many twists results in an annoying tangle. And there are too many twists in Antoni Stutz’s uninvolving Rushlights.”

On Rotten Tomatoes the film has an approval rating of 26% based on reviews from 19 critics, with average score of 4.19/10.

References

External links
 
 

American independent films
American thriller films
American neo-noir films
Vertical Entertainment films
2010s English-language films
2010s American films